Horseshoe Creek is a stream in Jackson and Lafayette counties in the U.S. state of Missouri. It is a tributary of Sni-A-Bar Creek.

The stream initially flows to the southeast then makes a broad "horseshoe turn" to continue north roughly parallel to the Lafayette-Jackson county line. The stream flows between Oak Grove and Bates City and passes under Interstate 70.

Horseshoe was so named for the fact its many meanders evokes a horseshoe shape.

See also
List of rivers of Missouri

References

Rivers of Jackson County, Missouri
Rivers of Lafayette County, Missouri
Rivers of Missouri